The Portales Forest Reserve was established by the General Land Office in New Mexico on October 3, 1905 with . On March 16, 1907 the forest was disestablished and the lands were returned to the public domain.

The proclamation, signed by Theodore Roosevelt, stated that the land was "no longer required for experimental forest purposes."

References

External links
Forest History Society
Listing of the National Forests of the United States and Their Dates (from Forest History Society website) Text from Davis, Richard C., ed. Encyclopedia of American Forest and Conservation History. New York: Macmillan Publishing Company for the Forest History Society, 1983. Vol. II, pp. 743-788.

Former National Forests of New Mexico
History of Roosevelt County, New Mexico
Defunct forest reserves of the United States